Alexandra Barrese (born April 24, 1981) better known as Sasha Barrese is an American former actress and professional poker player. She is best known for her role as Tracy Billings in The Hangover Trilogy.

Early life
Barrese was born on April 24, 1981, in Maui, Hawaii, to Katherine, a single mother. They moved to Paris, France where her mother worked as a model, returning to the United States in 1985. Her modeling career began during her school years for agencies including NEXT and Elite.

Career
Barrese and her mother had their acting debut in the 1989 comedy film Homer and Eddie. The following year they appeared as the younger and older versions of the title character in the drama film Jezebel's Kiss. In all subsequent roles, she is credited as "Sasha Barrese".

As an adult, Barrese had small roles in American Pie (1999), Hellraiser: Inferno (2000) and Legally Blonde (2001). She appeared as Tess in three episodes of the comedy television series Just Shoot Me!, before landing her first lead role on the WB sitcom Run of the House. She portrayed Sally Franklin, one of four siblings left to fend for themselves when their parents relocate to Arizona. She then appeared as Caitlin Mansfield in the television drama series LAX set in the airport of the same name. She also appeared in episodes of Drive; Supernatural; Roommates; CSI: Miami; Trauma; Robot Chicken; and Leverage. She had roles in the films The Hangover, The Hangover Part II, and The Hangover Part III, portraying Tracy Billings. She also appeared in the 2010 horror film Let Me In.

Personal life 
Barrese began playing draw poker, backgammon, gin and chess at an early age, saying "I'm Russian, so I've been playing games my whole life". She announced her plans to become a professional poker player in May 2014. She has competed in several tournaments, including the World Series of Poker in Las Vegas in 2014.

As of September 2020, Barrese has just under $120,000 in live tournament earnings, made in 31 different events over the course of seven years, and cashing in five WSOP events and six WSOP series events. She also engages in private cash games in Hollywood.

Filmography

References

External links
 

1981 births
Living people
American child actresses
American film actresses
American television actresses
American people of Russian descent
21st-century American actresses
Tabor Academy (Massachusetts) alumni
American poker players